Shirin Akter (born 12 October 1994) is a Bangladeshi female sprinter.

She competed at the 2016 Summer Olympics in Rio de Janeiro, in the women's 100 metres.

References

External links

1994 births
Living people
Bangladeshi female sprinters
Olympic athletes of Bangladesh
Athletes (track and field) at the 2016 Summer Olympics
Commonwealth Games competitors for Bangladesh
Athletes (track and field) at the 2014 Commonwealth Games
Athletes (track and field) at the 2018 Commonwealth Games
People from Satkhira District
Olympic female sprinters